Udayon is a 2005 Indian Malayalam-language comedy drama film written and directed by Bhadran and produced by Maha Subair. It stars Mohanlal in dual roles: 75-year-old farmer Suranadu Kunju and his happy-go-lucky son Papoyi, Laya plays the female lead role and also features Manoj K. Jayan, Kalabhavan Mani, Innocent, Jagathy Sreekumar, and Salim Ghouse in substantial roles. The film features original soundtrack composed by Ouseppachan.

Synopsis
Kunju is so obsessed with his land that he even grabs his sister's share by forging his father's will. Though he is known to be stubborn, his love for agriculture is appreciated by his youngest son.

Plot

Mohanlal plays the double role of 75-year-old Suranadu Kunju and his son Papoyi. Kunju thinks that the heartbeat of the earth is in soil (Agriculture) and not in any other vocation. His beliefs on land and agrarianism are good, but his value system that farmers and farming are more important and better than anything else is preposterous. He denies his sons the opportunity to pursue their interests and wants them to be successful in agriculture, which leads to frequent sarcastic quarrels between Kunju and his three sons. Also, when he decides to marry off his daughter to an odd looking but farming enthusiast instead of an educated, handsome Doctor makes them feel that the father is destroying and spoiling their lives with his ideals, stubbornness and high handedness.

Kunju had swindled a large portion of land (5 Acres) - which should have been inherited by his sister Eechamma (Bindu Panicker) - by discreetly altering his Father's Will with the crooked assistance of the Family advocate. The deceit is revealed to Eechamma - years later - by a severely ailing and remorseful Mullassery Sreedharan (V. K. Sreeraman) (the old advocate). Eechamma decides to get back her rightful share through a proper legal channel as her financial situation is in a bad position compared to Kunju. Eighteen years ago, Eecha's husband (A toddy shop owner) committed suicide due to a dire financial crisis - after beseechingly requesting Kunju for help, which the latter denied owing to his miserly behaviour. 

Mathan (Kalabhavan Mani), Eecha's second son - known as JCB for owning and operating a Bulldozer for his livelihood - and his villainous brother in law, a local Tamil village chieftain and an arbitrator, adds a twist as he interferes in the family property dispute. All said and done, the sister doesn't want evil to her brother, and her younger son, the mute, also doesn't want. Papoyi tries to save things but never has luck. Ultimately, Kunju's youngest son is used as a bait to coerce for the transfer of property. At last, amidst the chaos, Ponnan is killed, and Kunju kills the villainous brother in law Perumal (Salim Ghouse). And gives the family property keys to Eecha, and the patriarch stick to Papoyi after being arrested and taken to the prison. While leaving his house with the Police, Kunju - an impassive individual - wails loudly, repenting his misdeeds.

Cast 
 Mohanlal as
Shooranadu Kunju (father)
Shooranadu Papoyi (son)
 Kalabhavan Mani as Mathan, second son of Ichamma
 Manoj K. Jayan as Pottan, youngest son of Ichamma
 Innocent	as Shooranad Rarichan, first son of Kunju
 Laya as Nurse Maya, Papoyi's classmate and love interest
 Jagathy Sreekumar	as Shavappetty Thoma, first son of Ichamma
 Siddique	as Mammali
 Master Adarsh as Ponnan, youngest son of Kunju
 Kuku Paremeswaran as Malli
 Shammi Thilakan as Sub Inspector Itti		
 Bheeman Raghu as Circle Inspector Illikadan
 Mohan Jose as Manthodi Joppan
 Sadiq as Mathai, Pappoy's friend	
 Kulappulli Leela as Bullet Kuttiyamma
 Rajan P. Dev as Chetti
 M. R. Gopakumar as Chackochi, Ichamma's husband	
 Idavela Babu as Shooranad Itti, third son of Kunju
 Salim Ghouse as Perumal
 Nassar as Unni Vaidyan
 Bindu Panicker as Ichamma
 Rekha as Nangeli	
 Sukanya	as Susiemol, only daughter of Kunju
 Ambika Mohan as Rarichan's wife
 V. K. Sreeraman as Advocate Sreedharan 
 Kochu Preman as Kangaroo, Bus conductor 
 Vinayakan as Thoma's helper
 Valsala Menon as Karthyayani Amma
 Kalpana as Kunjujamma
 Unnikrishnan Namboothiri as Priest
 Baby Akshai as Son of Kuku Paremeswaran
 Vinod Therattil as Person helping Papoyi during the bus accident
 Baiju Ezhupunna, Koothattukulam Mathai as Tipper Lorry Driver

Production
Jyothika was offered to act as lead actress with Mohanlal. But she could not do it due to her busy schedules in Tamil. She was later replaced by Telugu actress Laya.

Soundtrack
The film features original soundtrack composed by Ouseppachan.

Track listing

Release
The film was released on 15 July 2005, and became an Average in the box office, also getting mixed to negative reviews from the critics. Most of the them criticized the complicated plot but Mohanlal’s Performance as the crafty, tough bordering on villainy, Shooranad Kunju was well praised. Webindia123 called the film "a must see for Mohanlal fans".

References

External links
 

2005 films
2005 action thriller films
2000s Malayalam-language films
Films directed by Bhadran
Indian action thriller films
Films scored by Ouseppachan
Films shot in Thrissur